Kozomín is a municipality and village in Mělník District in the Central Bohemian Region of the Czech Republic. It has about 500 inhabitants.

History

The first written mention of Kozomín is from 1400.

References

Villages in Mělník District